Rudolf Bamberger (21 May 1888 – 13 August 1945) was a German art director. He worked as a set designer in German theatre and cinema during the Weimar era. Following the introduction of sound film, he produced several documentaries. He was the elder brother of the director Ludwig Berger, and was married to the actress Hanna Waag.

The Jewish Bamberger left Germany following the Nazi takeover, and settled in Luxembourg. He was later arrested by Nazi authorities during the German wartime occupation and was sent to Auschwitz, where he was killed in there.

Selected filmography
 The Story of Christine von Herre (1921)
 A Glass of Water (1923)
 The Lost Shoe (1923)
 A Waltz Dream (1925)
 The Master of Nuremberg (1927)
 The Burning Heart (1929)

References

Bibliography
 Prawer, S.S. Between Two Worlds: The Jewish Presence in German and Austrian Film, 1910-1933. Berghahn Books, 2005.

External links

1888 births
1945 deaths
German art directors
Jewish emigrants from Nazi Germany
Mass media people from Mainz
German emigrants to Luxembourg
German people who died in Auschwitz concentration camp
German Jews who died in the Holocaust